The Digital Himalaya project was established in December 2000 by Mark Turin, Alan Macfarlane, Sara Shneiderman, and Sarah Harrison. The project's principal goal is to collect and preserve historical multimedia materials relating to the Himalaya, such as photographs, recordings, and journals, and make those resources available over the internet and offline, on external storage media. The project team have digitized older ethnographic collections and data sets that were deteriorating in their analogue formats, so as to protect them from deterioration and make them available and accessible to originating communities in the Himalayan region and a global community of scholars.

The project was founded at the Department of Anthropology of the University of Cambridge, moved to Cornell University in 2002 (when a collaboration with the University of Virginia was initiated), and then back to the University of Cambridge in 2005. From 2011 to 2014, the project was jointly hosted between the University of Cambridge and Yale University. In 2014, the project moved to the University of British Columbia, where it is presently located, and maintains a distant collaboration with Sichuan University.

Project Team 
Digital Himalaya has a team of 9 individuals who work together to develop user-friendly and accessible online resources:
 Sarah Harrison
 Daniel Ho
 Hikmat Khadka
 Wachiraporn Klungthanaboon
 Alan Macfarlane
 Pragyajan Rai (Yalamber)
 Sara Shneiderman
 Komintal Thami
 Mark Turin
The project is supported by an active international Advisory Board, including the following individuals:

 General Sir Sam Cowan
 Richard Feldman
 [Martin Gaenszle
 Ann Gammie
 David Germano
 Mark Goodridge
 David Holmberg
 Michael Hutt
 Kathryn March
 Christina Monson
Since its establishment, the Digital Himalaya project has benefited from skilled student interns and research assistants in Canada, Nepal, the United Kingdom, and the United States.

Funding 
For the first five years of active development, Digital Himalaya was successful in receiving competitive grants from many organizations. Once the site was launched and most of the collections were digitized and accessible, it became increasingly difficult to find resources to maintain the online collections. The project still receives support through donations from individuals and foundations, in addition to experimenting with small referral commissions through Amazon.

Financial and institutional partners:

The Technological Innovation and Cooperation for Foreign Information Access (TICFIA) Program, US Department of Education
Cornell Institute for Digital Collections, Cornell University
East Asia Program, Cornell University
Department of Asian Studies, Cornell University with supplemental support through the Freeman Foundation Undergraduate Initiative
Department of Anthropology, Cornell University
The Oxford Bön Project
The British Academy (Small Research Grant)
Anthropologists' Fund for Urgent Anthropological Research at the Royal Anthropological Institute
Frederick Williamson Memorial Fund
The Crowther Beynon Fund, University of Cambridge Museum of Archaeology and Anthropology
The Renaissance Trust
The Brendish Family Foundation
The Sager Family Traveling Foundation and Roadshow
The Department of Social Anthropology, University of Cambridge
SIT Study Abroad
Rashmi and Sanjay Shrestha
Andrew Clark and Mary Cobb
John R. Sanderson
Christina Monson
Dr. Mary Shepherd Slusser
venturethree

Collections 
The Digital Himalaya archive has more than 200,000 pages of scanned texts, hundreds of hours of video and audio, over 1,000 maps, and a large collection of original ethnographic content. The project has digitised an extensive set of back issues of Himalayan journals and maps. There are currently 13 collections available, and the newest addition to the archive is a collection of bird reports from Nepal.

Birds of Nepal 
Thanks to Tim Inskipp and Carol Inskipp, this collection has 2,155 references on birds in Nepal available to the public, dated from 1975 to 1999. The archive contains multiple sources, from books and scientific papers to published and unpublished reports, offering a valuable source for researchers interested in Himalayan bird populations.

Census of Nepal 2001 
This collection contains census data from the National Census of Nepal 2001. The Digital Himalaya team sorted the data for Nepal's 75 districts and their VDCs (Village Development Committee) making this public data available for any user to search and download.

Fürer-Haimendorf Film Collection 
This collection contains interviews with Professor Christoph von Fürer-Haimendorf and footage of his research in the Himalaya. Fürer-Haimendorf was an Austrian anthropologist based at the University of London who travelled across much of the Himalayan region, and conducted field research with Naga communities in India, and Sherpa communities in Nepal. The full collection is hosted at the School of Oriental and African Studies (SOAS).

Films 
Digital Himalaya is continuously expanding its online collections to include both historical and contemporary film and video. Below is a list of films available through the project's archive:

Journals of Himalayan Studies 
Digital Himalaya archives contain scanned copies of many journals, magazines and publications of Himalayan studies for free download. Here is a list of available titles:

Maps 
The web-based map collection includes:

Music and Audio from the Himalayas 
The Digital Himalaya music and audio archive includes:

Naga Videodisc 
The Naga Videodisc is a multimedia resource created by Alan Macfarlane at Cambridge University in the late 1980s. It includes a large amount of ethnographic material about Naga communities. With the support of Sarrah Harrison, the contents of the videodisc were converted into an online database that uses Bamboo as a retrieval system, with easily searchable XML files. Some film clips can be downloaded directly from the Digital Himalaya page, but the full collection can be seen on the Shanti Database at the University of Virginia.

Rare Books & Manuscripts 
This collection offers digitized versions of multiple rare books and manuscripts that are in the public domain. The archive contains files in PDF format, and are free to download.

Thak Archive 
This is a multimedia archive with photographs, films, census data, and economic and social data of the Gurung village of Thak in central western Nepal. These ethnographic records cover more than 30 years of work, and were collected by Alan Macfarlane and Sarah Harrison. The archive is regularly updated.

Thangmi Archive 
This is an emerging collection of linguistic and cultural data relating to the Thangmi community of northeastern Nepal. These collections were deposited by Mark Turin and Sara Shneiderman, who have been working in partnership with Thangmi communities in Nepal and India since 1997. This archive gives users access to an online trilingual Thangmi - Nepali - English dictionary (in PDF format), recordings of Thangmi songs from the Reng Patangko collection, and film clips of Thangmi rituals, all available for streaming and download.

Williamson Collection 
This collection contains films and photographs from Sikkim, Bhutan, and Tibet, in the 1930s. The films and photographs were taken by Frederick Williamson, a British Political Officer who documented his travels through the region with his wife, Margaret. The full collection is located at the Museum of Archaeology and Anthropology (MAA), at Cambridge.

Wutu Collection 
This collection contains 18 short films from 1996 showing the Wutu ritual, an exorcism ritual performed by the Monguor (Tu) people of the Gnyan thog Village. The films were shot by Zhu Yonzhong, with editing by Gerald Roche. The collection is stored in an archive at the University of Cambridge.

References

External links
Digital Himalaya Project
The Digital Himalaya Project: Collection, Protection & Connection

Himalayan studies
Himalayan culture
Himalayan peoples
Tibetan language
Geographic region-oriented digital libraries
British digital libraries
Digital humanities projects
Online archives
Tibeto-Burman languages
Digital libraries
History of Nepal
2000 establishments in Nepal